The Who by Numbers is the seventh studio album by English rock band the Who, released on 3 October 1975 in the United Kingdom through Polydor Records, and on 25 October 1975 in the United States by MCA Records. It was named the tenth-best album of the year in The Village Voice Pazz & Jop critics poll.

Background
Pete Townshend has claimed that the band recorded practically every song he had written for The Who by Numbers, partially due to a writer's block that he was experiencing at the time. The songs on the album were, for the most part, more introspective and personal than many other songs that the band had released. Townshend's 30th birthday occurred in May 1975; he was troubled with thoughts of being too old to play rock and roll and that the band was losing its relevance. He began to feel disenchanted with the music industry, a feeling that he carried into his songs. He said of the songs on the album:

After concluding the tour for the Quadrophenia album in June 1974, the Who took an extended hiatus and did not perform live for more than a year. John Entwistle kept himself occupied by playing solo gigs. In addition, the band spent this time filming Tommy, based on their rock opera of the same title.

This was their first album on Polydor. The sessions for The Who by Numbers began in April 1975 and lasted through early June. The album was released in October and the band supported it with a tour, which spanned some 70 concerts before concluding in the autumn of 1976.

For the album's recording, the band recruited producer Glyn Johns. The band had previously worked with Johns on the 1971 album Who's Next. Compared to previous Who albums, The Who by Numbers took an unusually long time to complete (as noted above, nearly three months) and was marred by numerous breaks and interruptions due to the band members' growing boredom and lack of interest. Only the songs on the first side of The Who by Numbers were performed live, and only "Squeeze Box" became a concert staple. "Imagine a Man" was performed live for the first time by the band in May 2019, nearly 44 years after its release. Roger Daltrey had featured the song in a solo concert in February 1994. Townshend said of the album's recording sessions:

Album cover
The album cover, in which the band members' bodies are made up of connect the dots puzzles, was drawn by John Entwistle. In 1996, when asked about the cover, he replied: "The first [piece of artwork] release[d] is The Who by Numbers cover, which I never got paid for, so now I'm going to get paid. (laughs) We were taking it in turns to do the covers. It was Pete's turn before me and we did the Quadrophenia cover, which cost about the same as a small house back then, about £16,000. My cover cost £32."

Release and reception

The Who by Numbers peaked at number 7 on the UK Albums Chart and number 8 on the Billboard Top LPs & Tape album chart in the US. "Squeeze Box" was also a Top 20 hit in both Britain and America, although the US follow-up, "Slip Kid", failed to chart.

The Rolling Stone review of The Who by Numbers stated: "They may have made their greatest album in the face of [their personal problems]. But only time will tell."

In an interview from Thirty Years of Maximum R&B, Townshend declared "Dreaming from the Waist" and "Sister Disco" (from Who Are You) as his least favourite songs to play on stage. In contrast, Entwistle declared in the same series of interviews that "Dreaming from the Waist" was one of his favourite songs to perform live. Daltrey referred to the album as his favourite in his memoir.

Remasters and reissues
The 1996 remaster was remixed by Jon Astley. On the remaster, the end of "They Are All in Love" is cross-faded with "Blue Red and Grey". The original album did not feature this cross-fade.

On 24 December 2011, the album was remastered and reissued in Japan using the original mix. The live bonus tracks from the previous edition were included on the reissue. The packaging replicated the original vinyl release of the album.

Track listing
All songs written by Pete Townshend, except where noted.

Personnel
The Who
Roger Daltrey – lead vocals
Pete Townshend – guitar, keyboards, banjo, accordion, ukulele, backing vocals, lead vocals on "However Much I Booze" and "Blue, Red And Grey"
John Entwistle – bass, French horn, trumpet, backing vocals, 2nd lead vocal on "Success Story"
Keith Moon – drums

Additional musicians
Nicky Hopkins – piano

Production
Glyn Johns – producer, engineer, mixing
Jon Astley – remixing (1996 reissue)
Chris Charlesworth – executive producer
Bill Curbishley – executive producer
Richard Evans – design
Doug Sax - mastering
Bob Ludwig – remastering
Robert Rosenberg – executive producer
John Entwistle – album cover art
John Swenson – liner notes
Chris Walter – photography

Charts

Certifications

References

External links
 

1975 albums
Albums produced by Glyn Johns
MCA Records albums
Polydor Records albums
The Who albums